(February 15, 1977 – October 6, 2010) was a Japanese professional wrestler, better known by the ring name . Naniwa was known for his comedic gimmick, in which he performed mannerisms of crabs. This was also reflected upon in the design of his wrestling mask.

Professional wrestling career
Naniwa debuted professionally in 1993 in Michinoku Pro Wrestling as a face. He participated in the 1995 Super J-Cup, managing to get to the quarterfinals, but he was later eliminated by eventual winner Jyushin Thunder Liger. In the late 1990s, Naniwa competed in the United States for Extreme Championship Wrestling (ECW). He wrestled Gran Hamada in January 1998 at the ECW House Party event. After this, Naniwa took a brief hiatus for a few years but made his return in 2006, again under his Gran Naniwa ring name, competing in a match for New Japan Pro-Wrestling's now defunct WRESTLE LAND "brand".

Death
Kimura died on October 6, 2010 due to a heart attack at the age of 33.

Championships and accomplishments
Michinoku Pro Wrestling
Central American Middleweight Championship (1 time)

References

External links
Cagematch profile 

1977 births
2010 deaths
Japanese male professional wrestlers
Masked wrestlers
20th-century professional wrestlers